is a Japanese series of science fiction novels written by Hiroyuki Morioka, which serve as a sequel to Crest of the Stars. Three novels in the series have been adapted into anime. The first series, Banner of the Stars (13 episodes, a.k.a. Seikai no Senki) was released in 2000 with a recap movie Banner of the Stars Special Edition following in 2001. That year, Banner of the Stars II (10 episodes, a.k.a. Seikai no Senki II) was also released. The third anime series, adapting the third novel, Banner of the Stars III (a.k.a. Seikai no Senki III) is an OVA released in Japan in 2005.

Characters

Main Characters

 After completing his training in military school, he joins Lafiel's crew as the supply officer of Basroil. He considers the ship his only home and even brings his cat Diaho aboard. He tries to conceal his friendship with the princess to prevent jealousy from amongst the crew. He is appointed as a deputy ambassador along with Lafiel several times. It is during the discharge of this duty that he almost lost his life. Although he succeeds in having his home planet Martine join the rest of Hyde Star System become part of the Abh Empire, he has to give up ever being able to set foot on its surface to show Lafiel how beautiful it is.

 After completing her apprenticeship, she becomes captain of Basroil. Diaho is her gift to Jinto before he left for military academy. She agrees to keep her friendship with him a secret but openly shows how much she cares for his well-being. She is appointed as ambassador several times. After Jinto is taken hostage and survives, she starts insisting to always keep him in sight going as far as taking leave from military service to accompany Jinto to the Hyde Star System. After surviving the destruction of the capital, Lafiel assumes her new role as the Crown Princess of the Empire.

Assault Ship Basroil
 Aicryac Üémh Tlyzr Naurh
 Basrogrh (Basroil) pilot who shows an interest in Jinto. She often serves as Diaho's sitter when Jinto is away.

 Basroil's first navigator. He becomes captain of a new class of assault ship while Lafiel is on leave but gives up the post upon her return.

Samsonn Borgh Tiruser Tirusec
 Basrogrh mechanic, a non-genetic Abh like Jinto who eventually becomes his first vassal.

Minor Characters
 Abriel Nei Debrusc Spunej Ramaj
 The current reigning empress of the Abh Empire, she is also Lafiel's grandmother. She personally leads the defense during the attack on the capital. 

 Abriel Nei Lamsar Larth Balkei Dusanyu
 The current Dusanyu, or crown prince, of the Abh Empire of Mankind and the commander-in-chief of the Abh Armed Forces. 

 Abriel Nei Debrusc Larth Kryb Debeus
 Lafiel's father, the King of Kryv and the Dusanyu's brother. He joins Abh fleet in the middle of the war and proceeds to the reclaim the Hyde Star System for the empire.

 Abriel Nei Debrusc Duhiel
 Lafiel's fifteen-year old younger brother who feels unable to measure up to his sister's accomplishments.

 Trife Boli Yuvdale Remsale
 Despite verging on excessive caution, he is nonetheless one of the most able tacticians in the Labule. 

 Spoor Aron Sekpadao Letopanyu Peneju
 A high ranking noble and one of the most able admirals of the Abh Fleet. Though complaining of boredom most of the time, she suddenly springs into action when needed. 

 Atosryac Syun-Atos Lyuf Febdash Klowal Loïc
 The fourth Baron of Febdash and Klowal's younger sister, Loïc is in command of a squadron of assault ships that included Basroil. She is a highly able commander.

Media

Novels
There are currently six novels in the Banner of the Stars series, originally released by Hayakawa Publishing from December 1996. On April 20, 2019, J-Novel Club announced their license of Banner of the Stars, along with their retranslated release of Crest of the Stars. The digital release followed J-Novel Club's model of releasing "prepub" chapters on their website for premium members before the digital retail release on their site and other platforms like Amazon. The physical release for both series is in hardcover omnibus format, with three volumes per issue, with the first Banner of the Stars omnibus released on February 2, 2021 and the second on March 15, 2022.

 Banner of the Stars I "The Ties That Bind" (星界の戦旗I 絆のかたち) (Seikai no Senki I "Kizuna no Katachi") (1996)
Three years after the outbreak of hostilities between the Abh Empire and the Alliance, Lafiel becomes captain of the brand new assault ship Basroil and Jinto who has finished his training joins her crew as a supply officer. They are attached to the imperial fleet assigned to defend the strategically important Laptic Gate from a force 15 times larger than their own. And to make things more worrisome, not only is their commanding officer the younger sister of the third baron Febdash, the admiral of their fleet and his chief-of-staff are from the Bebaus family notoriously known for their "Spectacular Insanity".

 Banner of the Stars II "What Needs Defending" (星界の戦旗II 守るべきもの) (Seikai no Senki II "Mamoru Beki Mono") (1998)
Lafiel and Jinto are appointed ambassadors and given a mission to form a government on a newly conquered planet, which turns out to be a detention planet full of prisoners. Jinto is kidnapped during a rebellion and Lafiel is forced to withdraw due to the military actions of the enemy, leaving Jinto behind. Weeks later she returns to rescue him.

 Banner of the Stars III "Dinner With Family" (星界の戦旗III 家族の食卓) (Seikai no Senki III "Kazoku no Shokutaku") (2001)
The main characters go to the Hyde star system (Jinto's home world and recently recovered imperial territory). On the way, Jinto encounters his friend Dorin Ku and is informed that a military war game will be held in the Hyde star system. Martine, the system's capital, refuses to surrender to the Abh Empire. Count Jinto negotiates with the Martinese government and seeks terms of surrender. At last, at the cost of the planet's autonomy and exile of the Count, Martine joins the Empire.

 Banner of the Stars IV "The Screech of Space-Time" (星界の戦旗IV 軋む時空) (Seikai no Senki IV "Kishimu Jikuu") (2004)
The main characters have returned to the Imperial fleet and Lafiel is now captain of a new ship, the assault frigate Flicaubh. Lafiel's younger brother Duhiel enlists in the navy and is dispatched to a battleship. The so far neutral Hania Federation unexpectedly offers to join the Abh Empire and Empress Ramaj accepts. While Jinto and Lafiel are returning to the Imperial capital, Lakfakalle, the Hania Federation fleet suddenly attack the Abh Empire and advances towards the capital.

 Banner of the Stars V "Destiny's Refrain" (星界の戦旗V 宿命の調べ) (Seikai no Senki V "Shukumei no Shirabe") (2013)
The three enemy nations launch a surprise attack on Lakfakalle from Hania territory with help from sympathetic elements within the Hania military. Unable to recall the fleets in time to mount a defense, the empire prepares to abandon its capital for the first time in its history. The empress leads the small fleet available to meet the enemy in a desperate attempt to buy time for the civilians and crucial production structures to be evacuated. Meanwhile, Lafiel and Jinto are assigned to an old cruiser and tasked with transporting the Memorial Stones, markers etched with the name of every person who has ever died for the empire and important cultural artifacts. At the same time Duhiel is trapped behind enemy lines, and his superiors must get him back to Imperial territory.

 Banner of the Stars VI "Thunder of the Empire" (星界の戦旗VI 帝国の雷鳴) (Seikai no Senki VI "Teikoku no Raimei") (2018)
The war got stagnant for a long decade after the fall of Lakfakalle. Now the Empire is split in two, and both parts of it are undermanned and have problems with proper supplies. Both the Alliance and the Empire are slowly building their forces to break the stalemate which has occurred after the fall of Lakfakalle. Finally, the Empire is ready to initiate the operation "Thunder", launching their attack at People's Sovereign Union of Planets in order to reunite the shards of Imperial controlled space and, if possible, annex the territory and secure the resources of the Union. Lafiel, the Crown Princess, and, as required by the title, the Admiral of the Fleet, is ordered to complete this operation using the forces she helped to train and amass on her previous assignment during past decade. She has to handle the lack of supplies and not quite experienced crews while taking over a whole star nation, all while being overlooked by one of the Imperial Elders and tempted to go beyond the operational orders.

Anime

Among fans, Banner of the Stars is a title used to describe all anime except Crest of the Stars (which Hiroyuki Morioka has said was not intended as the main idea of the story, but just an introduction to how Jinto and Lafiel met). Two TV series and an OVA have been released adapting the first three books. Bandai Entertainment released Banner of the Stars I and II seasons in North America in 2003, and in 2013 Funimation re-licensed the series and released them along with (subtitled-only) Banner of the Stars III in a 2018 DVD compilation. On December 25, 2019, Banner of the Stars along with Crest of The Stars was released on Blu-ray in Japan.

Banner of the Stars

Banner of the Stars II

Banner of the Stars III

Radio drama
FM Osaka broadcast radio drama adaptations of Banner of the Stars novels and they were later released on CDs. The latest episode, Banner of the Stars IV, was broadcast in 2006, but has not been released on a CD.

Manga
One-volume manga adaptations of the Banner of the Stars and Banner of the Stars II anime series have been released by Dengeki Comics on October 27, 2001 and July 27, 2002, drawn by Toshihiro Ono and Wasoh Miyakoshi respectively, after they were serialized in Monthly Comic Dengeki Daioh magazine in 2001 and 2002. The manga volumes were released in English by Tokyopop on August 3 and October 12, 2004 under the names Seikai Trilogy, Vol. 2: Banner of the Stars: The Shape of Bonds and Seikai Trilogy, Vol. 3: Banner of the Stars II: Protecting the Precious. These volumes were referred to by Tokyopop as the second and third parts of the Seikai Trilogy. This was because at the time of publishing, only three anime series were adapted from Hiroyuki Morioka's works, and Banner of the Stars III was yet to be made. Crest of the Stars was considered the first part of the trilogy.

Video game
The Banner of the Stars series was adaptated into a Japanese video game for Windows. Named after the series, Gainax released it on September 26, 2003. It is a member of the wargame genre, featuring interactions with some characters from the novels in-between the battles. A port for the PlayStation 2 console was released on April 21, 2005.

Reception
Banner of the Stars was nominated for the Grand Prize of the 1st Sense of Gender Award in 2001.

References

External links
Sunrise page
Bandai Entertainment page (BOTS I/II)

1996 Japanese novels
2000 anime television series debuts
2001 anime television series debuts
2005 anime OVAs
Bandai Entertainment anime titles
Bandai Namco franchises
Crest of the Stars
Dengeki Comics
Funimation
J-Novel Club books
Novels by Hiroyuki Morioka
Shōnen manga
Space opera novels
Space opera anime and manga
Sunrise (company)
Tokyopop titles
Wowow original programming